Isobel "Izzy" Dalton (born 9 September 1997) is an Australian soccer player, who plays for Lewes in the English FA Women's Championship. She has represented Australia in the Australia women's national under-17 soccer team.

Playing career

Bristol Academy 
After completing high school in Australia, Isobel made the move back to England to begin her professional career at Bristol Academy (now Bristol City) during the 2014/15 season. Dalton made her FA WSL debut against Arsenal WFC under manager Willie Kirk.

Brisbane Roar 
Dalton has had three stints at Brisbane Roar during the 2014–15, 2019–20 and 2020–21 seasons. Making her debut on 8 November 2014, in a 3–0 win over Adelaide United, since her debut she has made 24 more appearances for the side. Dalton recently topped the league with the most assists in the 2020/21 season with a total 7, while the team went on to finish 2nd in the regular season. She also won Brisbane Roar Player of the Year in the same season.

Napoli Femminile 
In the 2020–21 season Dalton made the move to Italian giants Napoli, playing in the Serie A. She was soon joined by fellow Australians Alexandra Huynh and Jacynta Galabadaarachchi.

Lewes FC Women 
Dalton joined the 'Equality FC' based club in the summer of 2021 off the back of an award-winning season spent with Brisbane Roar. Lewes FC is the first and currently only club in the world with equal playing budgets for men and women. Dalton has since appeared 22 times for the club, scoring 2 goals and 1 penalty against Reading FC in the Continental Cup group stage in the latter part of 2021.

University of Colorado, Boulder 
After spending 2015 at Lindsay Wilson College in Kentucky, scoring 7 times with 3 assists, Dalton switched to the University of Colorado Boulder to play for the Colorado Buffaloes, being awarded an honorable mention in the 2018 Pac-12 All-Academic team. Dalton graduated from the University of Colorado with a Bachelor of Science in sociology in May 2019.

References

1997 births
Living people
Brisbane Roar FC (A-League Women) players
Colorado Buffaloes women's soccer players
S.S.D. Napoli Femminile players
A-League Women players
Serie A (women's football) players
Australian women's soccer players
Women's association football midfielders
British emigrants to Australia
Australian expatriate sportspeople in England
Australian expatriate sportspeople in the United States
Naturalised citizens of Australia
Sportspeople from the Sunshine Coast
Soccer players from Queensland
Footballers from Barnsley
Lewes F.C. Women players
Women's Championship (England) players